Rubén Pablo Magnano (born 9 October 1954) is an Argentine-Italian professional basketball coach.

Coaching career
Magnano served as the head coach of the senior men's Argentine national team. He led Argentina to the silver medal at the 2002 FIBA World Championship. Argentina also beat Team USA during the tournament.

He also led Argentina to a gold medal at the 2004 Summer Olympic Games. In the process, Argentina once again beat Team USA, that time in the tournament's semifinals.

In January 2010, he became the head coach of the senior men's Brazilian national team until 2016. He was granted the Platinum Konex Award 2010 as the best head coach from the last decade in Argentina. In 2018, he became the head coach of the senior men's Uruguay national team.

Awards and accomplishments

Coaching career

Pro clubs
4× Argentine League Champion: (1992, 1998, 1999, 2009)
2× South American Club Champion: (1993, 1994)
Argentine 2nd Division Champion: (1995)
Pan American Club Championship Champion: (1996)
2× South American League Champion: (1997, 1998)
Argentine League Coach of the Year: (2000)

National teams
2001 FIBA AmeriCup: 
2002 FIBA World Cup: 
2003 FIBA AmeriCup: 
2004 Summer Olympics: 
2011 FIBA AmeriCup:

References

External links
Spanish League Coaching Profile 
Italian League Coaching Profile 

1954 births
Living people
Argentine basketball coaches
Argentine expatriate basketball people in Spain
Argentine expatriate sportspeople in Brazil
Argentine expatriate sportspeople in Italy
Argentine people of Italian descent
Italian expatriate basketball people in Spain
Italian basketball coaches
Medalists at the 2004 Summer Olympics
Olympic gold medalists for Argentina
Pallacanestro Varese coaches
People from Villa María
FIBA Hall of Fame inductees
Sportspeople from Córdoba Province, Argentina